The Innocent Age is the seventh album by American singer-songwriter Dan Fogelberg, released in 1981. It was also one of his most successful albums; three of his four Top 10 singles on the Billboard pop chart ("Hard to Say" (no. 7), "Same Old Lang Syne" (no. 9), and "Leader of the Band" (no. 9) were from this album, as well as another Top 20 single in "Run for the Roses" (no. 18). All four also reached the Top 10 on the Billboard adult contemporary chart, with "Leader of the Band" reaching number 1 on that chart. The album also includes his song "Times Like These" from the 1980 Urban Cowboy soundtrack. Two of the prominent contributing vocalists are Joni Mitchell and Emmylou Harris. The Innocent Age drew its inspiration from Thomas Wolfe's major novel Of Time and the River.
The Innocent Age was originally released as a 2-LP Vinyl set and later as a 2-disc CD set.

Track listing

Production
 Producers – Dan Fogelberg and Marty Lewis
 Engineer – Marty Lewis
Recorded at Northstar Studios (Boulder, CO); Caribou Ranch (Nederland, CO); Rudy Records and Wally Heider Studios (Hollywood, CA); Sunset Sound (Los Angeles, CA); Record Plant (Sausalito, CA).
 Mixed at Sunset Sound
 Cover Design – Kosh
 Cover Photography – Dan Fogelberg and Andy Katz
 Liner Photography – Andy Katz
 Liner Notes – David Awells
 Text – Thomas Wolfe

Charts

Album

Singles

References

Dan Fogelberg albums
1981 albums
Epic Records albums